Cécile Gueidan is a mycologist and lichenologist who applies morphological and molecular biological methods to the origin and taxonomy of fungi that live in lichen symbioses and within rocks.

Early life and education
Gueidan began working on lichens during her Maitrise (1998) and DEA (1999) qualifications from Université Louis Pasteur and National Museum of Natural History, France. This included practical fieldwork experience with Claude Roux.

She then studied molecular methods for lichen taxonomy at Duke University, USA and applied them to pyrenocarpous and Verrucariaceae lichens. Through combining morphological and molecular characters, she was able to refine the taxonomy of these groups. She was awarded her doctorate for this research in 2007.

Career
Her research focuses on the evolution and taxonomy of lichenised fungi and other ascomycete fungi.

After gaining her doctorate, Gueidan carried out research at the Westerdijk Institute in the Netherlands on relationships between ascomycete fungi that inhabit rock and others involved in lichen symbioses. She then continued research into lichens within the family Verrucariaceae and related fungi at the Natural History Museum in London between 2010 and 2014. Since 2013 she has been a team leader at the Australian National Herbarium, part of the Commonwealth Scientific and Industrial Research Organisation (CSIRO).

Publications
Gueidan is the author or co-author of at least 65 scientific publications including:
 
 
 
 
 
 Daillant, O.,  Gueidan, C., Roche, F., Nicolas, M and Nicolas F. (2001) Observation des lichens et évolution de la qualité de l’air dans l’agglomération de Mâcon. Terre Vive 122 13-22.

Honours and awards
In 2010/11 Gueidan received the Elias Magnus Fries Medal. This is an award for the quality and quantity of research by an early career mycologist working in Europe from the International Mycological Association. The lichen species Ocellularia gueidaniana was named in her honour in 2015.

See also
 :Category:Taxa named by Cécile Gueidan

References

Date of birth missing (living people)
French lichenologists
Duke University alumni
French mycologists
University of Strasbourg alumni
Year of birth missing (living people)
21st-century French scientists
French taxonomists
CSIRO people
Living people